Mack of the Century... Too $hort's Greatest Hits is a compilation of the hits by rapper Too $hort.

Track listing

References 

2006 greatest hits albums
Too Short compilation albums
Jive Records compilation albums